Alexandros Nikolopoulos (1875 in Athens, date of death unknown) was a Greek weightlifter. He competed at the 1896 Summer Olympics in Athens. In the one-handed event now known as the snatch, Nikolopoulos finished third out of the four lifters.  He lifted 57.0 kilograms with one hand, matching the silver medallist Viggo Jensen, but could only manage 40.0 kilograms with the other, the same as fourth-place finisher Sotirios Versis.

References

External links 

1875 births
Year of death missing
Greek male weightlifters
Olympic weightlifters of Greece
Olympic bronze medalists for Greece
Weightlifters at the 1896 Summer Olympics
19th-century sportsmen
Olympic medalists in weightlifting
Medalists at the 1896 Summer Olympics
Date of birth missing
Sportspeople from Athens
Place of death missing